Museum of World Treasures is a world history museum in Wichita, Kansas, United States. Among the many items on display are  Tyrannosaurus, Daspletosaurus, and Tylosaurus specimens (Including "Ivan the T. rex"), Egyptian mummies, signatures of all the American presidents, a section of the Berlin Wall, and a genuine shrunken head.  The Museum of World Treasures is not limited to a particular era of history, but has opted to display a diverse collection representing many different fields of interest and a wide range of subjects. This museum is a member of the American Alliance of Museums, but is not accredited by the organization.

History
The museum first opened as the Museum of Ancient Treasures on April 22, 2001, at the Garvey Building in Downtown Wichita. The bulk of the exhibits were originally from the collection of the museum's founder, Dr. Jon Kardatzke.

In less than a year, the size and diversity of the museum's collection had changed. It now consisted of over 30 individual private collections, and spanned numerous significant events and cultures from prehistory to the present. Spurred by the purchase of three complete fossil dinosaur skeletons, the museum was forced to look for a larger space to exhibit its vast and growing collection.

The museum relocated to the "Farm and Art Market" in Old Town, Wichita, in 2003 and was renamed The Museum of World Treasures. The new location is a reconstructed three story warehouse that was completely renovated to house the expansive museum collection.

There have now been over 300 collectors who have their items stored and on display as loans or donations at the Museum. The museum owns approximately 75% of the artifacts.

Layout
The three stories of the museum contain a diverse array of historical artifacts. Access to the separate floors can be obtained via a central spiral staircase, or the popular glass elevator that rises above the towering dinosaur exhibit. The first floor also contains the entry foyer and Museum Store.

First floor

The 1st floor of the museum focuses on fossils and ancient human history, as well as a room dedicated to geology. Exhibits of note are:
Ivan the T. rex - found by Alan Komrosky in 2007, this giant Tyrannosaurus rex  is about 65% fossil.  When it was found, it had the most complete tail of any T. rex, with only three vertebrae missing.
"Sea Creatures of the Plains" - Showcasing Kansas Marine fossils, such as a 34 ft. Tylosaurus, a Xiphactinus, and a mosasaur.
Egyptian mummies - Female mummies from ancient Egypt
Coins of the Roman Emperors - A 50 ft. time line that showcases gold, silver, and bronze coins from nearly every Roman Emperor, as well as write-ups on their exploits and conquests.
World Civilizations - Greek, Roman, Etruscan, Egyptian, Pre Columbian, African, Southeast Asian & Ancient Near East showcases.

Second floor
The 2nd floor of the Museum focuses on military history, presidents, and royalty from around the world. Exhibits of note are:
More Than Darkness - Documents and artifacts from the  Middle Ages.
A Touch of Classicism: Telling the Story of the Renaissance - A journey through the cultural phenomenon known as the Renaissance. 
Military Gallery - Weaponry and artifacts from the Revolutionary War, the American Civil War, World War I (including a large scale recreation of Trench Warfare), World War II, the Korean War, and the Vietnam War.
American Presidents Gallery - Contains the signature of every American president, as well as a replica of the famous Resolute Desk.

Third floor

The exhibits on the 3rd floor feature an ensemble of material from American history. In addition, the top floor of the museum also has a large banquet room that can be rented out for private functions. Exhibits of note are:
All Are Not Free - features artifacts from the Cold War telling the story of life east of the Iron Curtain.
Ivan's PlayHouse - A kid-oriented play space with educational components.
Romancing the West - contains cowboys, Native Americans, frontier living, the Pony Express, and other Western artifacts.
Historic Composers and Music - features original manuscripts from Mozart, Beethoven, Elvis, and Frank Sinatra.
Kardatzke Historic Authors Collection - collections of famous historic authors and poets such as Robert Frost and Mark Twain.
Rentable Event Space - a large space that may be rented for weddings, dinners, meetings, and more.

Rotating exhibits
Some exhibits featured at the Museum of World Treasures are on display for a limited time.

Organization
The Museum of World Treasures is a not-for-profit 501(c)(3) Kansas corporation. The Museum is governed by a Board of Directors.

Programming
The museum focuses heavily on its mission to educate, entertain, and inspire with programs such as:
 Camp-Ins
 Educational Tours
 Scout Programs
 Community Outreach Programs
 Educational Partnerships
Adult programming in the form of lectures and evening events

See also
Nearby museums west of Arkansas River in Wichita:
 Botanica, The Wichita Gardens
 Exploration Place
 Mid-America All-Indian Center
 Old Cowtown Museum
 Wichita Art Museum

Nearby museums east of Arkansas River in downtown and oldtown areas of Wichita:
 Great Plains Transportation Museum
 Kansas Sports Hall of Fame
 Wichita-Sedgwick County Historical Museum

References

External links
 Museum of World Treasures Home Site
 360 Wichita Museum Featurette
 Kansas Travel - Museum of World Treasures
 TripAdvisor.com Museum of World Treasures Review
 Buzzle.com Review - "One of the Most Exciting Museums in the Country"

History museums in Kansas
Museums established in 2001
Museums in Wichita, Kansas